Pygmaepterys juanitae is a species of sea snail, a marine gastropod mollusk in the family Muricidae, the murex snails or rock snails.

Description

Distribution
This species occurs in the Caribbean Sea off Venezuela

References

External links
 Gibson-Smith J. & Gibson-Smith W. (1983). New Recent gastropod species from Venezuela and a bivalve range extension. The Veliger. 25(3): 177-181

Muricidae
Gastropods described in 1983